Valley View Independent School District is a public school district in unincorporated Hidalgo County, Texas (USA), near Pharr and McAllen,  from the Mexico border. Its offices are at 9701 S. Jackson RD Pharr, TX 78577.

Covering , it serves 4,366 grade PK-12 students in the cities of Hidalgo, McAllen and Pharr. In 2009, it was rated "academically acceptable" by the Texas Education Agency.

In 2018, Valley View Elementary and South Valley View Elementary schools were both named National Blue Ribbon Schools by the U.S. Department of Education.

Valley View's soccer team, the Tigers, is ranked in the top 20 nationally. Year after year, they have been eliminated in the quarter-finals and semi-finals. They reached the final, which they lost in the last minute of play; it was their only loss of the year.

David Garcia was ranked #1 in the world in the 114 lbs. division of power lifting, which he won in Reno, Nevada.

Schools
Valley View High School (Grades 9-12) (With only a couple of hundreds T-STEM [Science, Technology, Engineering, and Mathematics]  freshmen each year) 
Valley View Early College Campus (Grades 8-9)
Valley View Junior High School (Grades 6-7)
Valley View 5th Grade Campus (Grade 5)
Valley View Elementary (Grades PK-4)
Valley View North Elementary (Grades PK-4)
Valley View South Elementary (Grades PK-4)
Wilbur E. Lucas Elementary (Grades PK-4) (Named after a founder of the Valley View Independent School District)

References

External links

 

School districts in Hidalgo County, Texas
Pharr, Texas